Star Wars: The Clone Wars is a video game set in the Star Wars universe developed by Pandemic Studios and published by LucasArts for GameCube, PlayStation 2 and Xbox.

This game mostly consists of vehicular combat using clone warships, starfighters, speeder bikes and tanks, as well as missions where players can control Anakin Skywalker, Obi-Wan Kenobi, or Mace Windu.

Gameplay
The game is split up into two segments: vehicles and third-person Jedi fighting. The vehicle segments involve most vehicles from the Star Wars universe: STAPs, tanks, AATs, AT-XTs, and Republic gunships. The controls used involve primary and secondary fire, acceleration and a special ability that changes from vehicle to vehicle. The Jedi segments use basic lightsaber slashing and two force powers, which rely on a force power bar, lightsaber throw and force push.

Despite Star Wars: The Clone Wars' focus on vehicular combat, a critically acclaimed mode where players take control of Jedi from an isometric perspective became the defining selling point for the game.

Synopsis
The game begins with the Battle of Geonosis from Episode II: Attack of the Clones. Jedi Masters Mace Windu and Luminara Unduli lead a strike force of Jedi to weaken Separatist defenses and rescue Anakin Skywalker and Obi-Wan Kenobi. As Anakin and Obi-Wan are rescued, an army of Clone troopers arrive and battle the Separatist droid armies as Windu takes part in taking down key Separatist ships. Later on in the story, Anakin and Obi-Wan organize an evacuation of a Republic outpost on Rhen Var, leading the escape only minutes before the Separatist Army captures the planet.

One month after the Battle of Geonosis, the Republic detects unusual activity on Raxus Prime, and sends a strike force led by Anakin and Obi-Wan to investigate. On arrival, they find Separatist forces at an excavation site. They send for reinforcements to take the planet. The Republic captures Raxus Prime, but during the battle, Anakin is captured by Sith Lord Count Dooku and bounty hunter Cydon Prax.

Anakin is sent to Alaris Prime, a moon in the Kashyyyk system, to be executed. Anakin and the other prisoners are doomed to be killed by the Force Harvester, an ancient Sith weapon that drains the Force from all living things within its range. Anakin is able to escape his cell and uses a speeder to escape the Force Harvester's range. Anakin, with help from a female smuggler named Bera Kazan, infiltrates a Separatist communications outpost to contact the Republic for help. Then Anakin, Bera and the local Wookiee population hold off the Separatist forces until Republic reinforcements led by Obi-Wan arrive. Anakin and Obi-Wan then lead a counterattack against the Separatists and successfully liberate Alaris Prime.

Anakin returns to the Jedi Temple on Coruscant and informs Jedi Master Yoda and Windu of the Harvester. Windu then tells Anakin and Obi-Wan of the Dark Reaper, an ancient Sith weapon built during the Great Sith War that was so powerful that none could withstand it. It required large amounts of energy to operate, which the Harvester could provide. Windu then mentions that the Reaper was destroyed by a fallen Jedi Knight named Ulic Qel-Droma, and the remains of the Sith weapon were scattered by the Jedi across the galaxy. To learn more about the Dark Reaper, Anakin and Obi-Wan lead Republic forces to Rhen Var, Qel-Droma's final resting place, to retake the planet from the Separatists. After a long battle, Anakin is led to an ancient tomb, where he meets Qel-Droma as a Force ghost, who agrees to teach Anakin how to defeat the Dark Reaper and reveal the location of the Sith weapon. Qel-Droma at the same time warns Anakin that this knowledge and power could lead him on the path to the Dark Side. With the Dark Reaper located on the ancient Sith world Thule, Anakin, Obi-Wan, and Windu lead Republic forces to Thule to prevent the Sith weapon from being rebuilt.

Before the Republic can invade Thule, Anakin leads a strike force on the planet's moon to take out the planetary shield generator. Once on Thule, Obi-Wan and Windu lead Republic forces in eliminating Separatist defenses guarding the planet capital Kessiak, where the Sith Temple that holds the Dark Reaper is located. As the defenses fall, Republic forces enter Kessiak. While the Jedi and Republic forces battle the Separatists, Anakin enters the Sith Temple to destroy the Dark Reaper. Inside the temple, Anakin kills Cydon Prax and confronts the Dark Reaper, now operational. With guidance from Qel-Droma, Anakin is able to destroy the Dark Reaper and claim victory for the Republic on Thule. Obi-Wan acknowledges Anakin's growing power, but warns him to not let it consume him. As Republic forces are leaving Thule after the battle, Windu believes that the battle may have turned the tide of the war, but Yoda reminds him the war is far from over.

Reception

The game received above-average reviews according to the review aggregation website Metacritic. In Japan, where the GameCube version was ported and published by Electronic Arts on March 20, 2003, Famitsu gave it a score of 27 out of 40.

References

External links
 

2002 video games
GameCube games
Electronic Arts games
LucasArts games
Military science fiction video games
Pandemic Studios games
PlayStation 2 games
Star Wars: Episode II – Attack of the Clones video games
Clone Wars, The
Xbox games
Articles using Wikidata infoboxes with locally defined images
Video games developed in the United States
Multiplayer and single-player video games